Juggernaut of Justice is the fourteenth studio album by Canadian heavy metal band Anvil. It was recorded at Dave Grohl's Studio 606 in Northridge, Los Angeles, and produced by Bob Marlette. It was released on May 10, 2011. Juggernaut of Justice sold over 1,600 copies in its first week of release in the U.S. It is the final Anvil album to feature bassist Glenn Five.

Track listing

Personnel 
 Anvil
 Steve "Lips" Kudlow – vocals, lead guitar
 Glenn Five – bass, lead vocals on track 7, backing vocals
 Robb Reiner – drums

 Additional musicians
 Lisa Joy Pimentel – horns on track 12

 Production
 Bob Marlette – producer, record engineer, mixing
 Clif Norrell – mastering

Charts

References 

Anvil (band) albums
2011 albums
Albums produced by Bob Marlette
The End Records albums
SPV/Steamhammer albums